James Henry (1731 – December 9, 1804) was an American lawyer from Virginia who was a delegate to the Continental Congress.

He was first elected to the Congress on December 17, 1779, but didn't enter the Congress until April 1780. Although he was elected again the following year, he attended no other sessions.

James Henry was a native of Virginia, who studied law at the University of Edinburgh. Afterwards, he settled on the eastern shore of Virginia. He was a member of the Virginia House of Burgesses in 1772–1774. Following the declaration of independence, he became a member of the state legislature. In 1779, he was appointed a judge of the court of admiralty and thus a judge of the first Court of Appeals. In 1789, when the Court of Appeals was reorganized, he was made a judge of the general court.

References

External links
Biographic sketch at U.S. Congress website

1731 births
1804 deaths
Continental Congressmen from Virginia
18th-century American politicians
Justices of the Supreme Court of Virginia
Virginia lawyers
Virginia state court judges
People from Accomack County, Virginia